IHV is a three-letter acronym that may refer to:
The Institute of Human Virology
An independent hardware vendor
Institute of Health Visiting
 Ice Hockey Victoria